Kayraktepe Dam is a planned hydroelectric plant of Turkey.

It is to the south west of Turkish state highway  which connects Mersin to Karaman.

The dam is planned to be on Göksu River. It was planned 30 years ago. But Göksu River valley is a fertile agricultural area (olive, grapes, figs, apricot etc.) and the construction was delayed because of the environmental concerns.

Technical details
The area of the reservoir will be  between Silifke, Mut and Gülnar ilçes. The nominal power of the turbines will be 281.75 MWe. With this power the annual energy production is calculated to be .

References

Dams in Mersin Province
Hydroelectric power stations in Turkey
Silifke District
Proposed hydroelectric power stations
Proposed renewable energy power stations in Turkey